Carolyn Craig (born Adele Ruth Crago, October 27, 1934 – December 12, 1970) was an American actress who was best known for her performance as Nora Manning in William Castle's 1959 shocker House on Haunted Hill.

Career
Craig gained early acting experience at the Community Playhouse in Santa Barbara, California. She made her film debut in Giant (1956) as Lacey Lynnton and had a lead role in the 1957 film noir Portland Exposé as Ruth Madison. She was also the second female lead in the 1958 Western Apache Territory.

Sometimes billed as Caroline Craig, she also made numerous guest appearances on television, including a recurring role on the soap opera General Hospital. Craig made a guest appearance on the fourth episode of the television series Perry Mason; she played Helen Waters in "The Case of the Drowning Duck". Craig also made a guest appearance on season 1 episode 3 "End of a Young Gun" of The Rifleman in October 1958, playing Ann Bard, a young woman who sparked the interest of Will Fulton, played by Michael Landon.

On April 8, 1958, Craig was cast as Edna Granger, a young woman with an unrequited romantic interest in deputy Marshal Wyatt Earp in the Western series The Life and Legend of Wyatt Earp.

On April 9, 1962, Craig was cast in the episode "The Fortune Hunter" of the Western series Laramie in the role of Kitty McAllen.

Personal life and death
Craig in 1957 married Charles E. Graham and in 1959 gave birth to their child, a son. After divorcing Graham in 1961, she married Arthur Francis Bryden, a union that lasted until April 1970. Later that same year, on December 12, Craig died in Los Angeles from a self-inflicted gunshot wound.

Filmography

References

External links

 

1934 births
1970 deaths
20th-century American actresses
Actresses from New York (state)
American film actresses
American television actresses
Burials at Inglewood Park Cemetery
Suicides by firearm in California
People from Long Island
People from Greater Los Angeles
1970 suicides